Running Creek is a stream in the municipality of Chatham-Kent in Southwestern Ontario, Canada. It is a left distributary of the Chenail Ecarté (The Snye), is a tributary of the North Sydenham River, and is part of the Great Lakes Basin.

The North Sydenham River flows via the Sydenham River, Lake St. Clair and the Detroit River to Lake Erie.

References

Rivers of Chatham-Kent